OWI may refer to: 

United States Office of War Information
"operating while intoxicated", "operating while impaired", see Driving under the influence#Terminology
Owi Airfield, Schouten Islands, Indonesia; a WWII USAAF airfield of the South West Pacific Theatre
Ottawa Municipal Airport (FAA identifier OWI), KS, USA
Owiniga language (ISO 639 language code owi)

See also